Aloysius John Wycisło (June 17, 1908 – October 11, 2005) was an American prelate of the Roman Catholic Church who served as the eighth bishop of the Diocese of Green Bay in Wisconsin from 1968 to 1983. Previously, he served as an auxiliary bishop for the Archdiocese of Chicago in Illinois from 1960 to 1968.

Biography

Early life and education
Wycisło was born on June 17, 1908, to Simon and Victoria Czech Wycisło in Chicago, Illinois. He attended St. Mary of Czestochowa School in Cicero, Illinois; Archbishop Quigley Preparatory Seminary (high school) in Chicago; Mundelein Seminary at the St. Mary of the Lake Seminary in Mundelein, Illinois; and The Catholic University of America in Washington, D.C., where he earned a master's degree in social work.

Priesthood
Wycisło was ordained on April 7, 1934, by Cardinal George Mundelein at the University of St. Mary of the Lake. During World War II and into the 1950s, he served in Catholic War Relief Services, established refugee camps in the Middle East, India, and Africa, and later worked coordinating aid throughout Eastern and Western Europe at the request of the Polish American Relief Organization. Wycisło was among the first American priests to enter Poland after the war and he reported that the postwar Polish government had forbidden mentioning the pope in the press and in Polish churches.

Auxiliary Bishop of Chicago
Wycisło was consecrated a bishop on December 21, 1960, and served as auxiliary bishop to Cardinal Albert Meyer of the Archdiocese of Chicago.

In September 1962, Cardinal Meyer asked Wycisło to direct the Archdiocese of Chicago's observance of Poland’s millennium of Christianity. Wycisło handled all the preparations, including arrangements for the visit of the primate of Poland, Cardinal Stefan Wyszyński.

Second Vatican Council (1962-1965) 
Wycisło was a council father from the first session of the Second Vatican Council in Rome, which opened October 11, 1962, to the concluding liturgy for the entire Council on December 8, 1965.

In addition to attending all the sessions, Wycisło served as a member of the American Bishops’ Commissions on the Lay Apostolate and on the Missions and the Oriental Church. He met and became friends with Karol Wojtyła, then-Archbishop of Krakow, Poland, and who became Pope John Paul II.

Bishop of Green Bay
Wycisło was appointed Bishop of the  Diocese of Green Bay on March 8, 1968, by Pope Paul VI. Wycisło was installed on April 16, 1968. His episcopal motto was Caritati Instate (Be Steadfast in Charity).

Retirement and legacy 
On June 17, 1983, his 75th birthday, Wycisło submitted his letter of resignation to the Holy See. He remained active during his retirement by performing confirmations.

On Aloysius Wycisło's death in 2005 at the age of 97, he was the oldest living Roman Catholic bishop in the United States, and also was one of the few living Fathers of the Second Vatican Council.

Publications 

 Vatican Two Revisited; Reflections by One who was there 
 The Saint Peter

See also

 Catholic Church hierarchy
 Catholic Church in the United States
 Historical list of the Catholic bishops of the United States
 List of Catholic bishops of the United States
 Lists of patriarchs, archbishops, and bishops

References

External links
 Roman Catholic Archdiocese of Chicago
 Roman Catholic Diocese of Green Bay

1908 births
2005 deaths
20th-century Roman Catholic bishops in the United States
American people of Polish descent
Participants in the Second Vatican Council
Clergy from Chicago
Religious leaders from Illinois
Roman Catholic Archdiocese of Chicago
Roman Catholic bishops of Green Bay
Catholic University of America alumni
University of Saint Mary of the Lake alumni
Writers from Chicago
Writers from Green Bay, Wisconsin
Catholics from Illinois